A Constructive Survey of Upanishadic Philosophy is a book by Ramachandra Dattatrya Ranade, also known as Gurudev Ranade, who was an eminent scholar of the Upanishads who specialised in Greek philosophy and emphasized the centrality of a psychological approach as opposed to a theological approach for the proper understanding of the Ultimate Reality. The book was first published in 1926 by Oriental Books Agency, Pune, under the patronage of Sir Parashuramarao Bhausaheb, Raja of Jamkhandi. It was later republished by Bharatiya Vidya Bhavan, Mumbai.

Ranade wrote the book on the basis of his various lectures on Upanishads and the Bhagavad Gita that were delivered in 1915. In that year, inspired by a lecture of Sir Ramakrishna Gopal Bhandarkar, he had first conceived the idea of a presentation of Upanishadic philosophy in terms of modern thought. He took into consideration of the place of the Upanishads in Indian philosophy, and examined the opinions of the Orientalists with a view to put into hand of the Orientalists and those interested a new method for treating the problems of Indian philosophy, and into the hands of European philosophers a new material for exercising their intellects on, to serve the main intended spiritual purpose. He employed "the method of construction through a systematic exposition of all the problems that emerge from the discussion of Upanishadic thought in their manifold bearings". The work is broadly divided into seven chapters. First he deals with the background of Upanishadic Speculation, then with the development of Upanishadic Cosmogony. He discusses the varieties of psychological reflection and the roots of later philosophies, before taking up the problem of the Ultimate Reality in the Upanishads. He covers the ethics of the Upanishads, and finally the intimation of self-realisation. It is a wide-ranging study that through Jnanamarga leads to the inference that dualism or pluralism is only apparent. Ranade provides an exhaustive bibliography that classifies the secondary books on Upanishads under three basic heads: as histories of literature, histories of religion and histories of philosophies.

References

External links
 R.D Ranade (1926), A Constructive Survey of Upanishadic Philosophy
 Gurudev Ranade International Website

Books about the Upanishads
Hindu philosophy
Contemporary philosophical literature
1926 non-fiction books
Indian non-fiction books
Philosophy books
20th-century Indian books